The Filmfare Best Villain Award was given by the Filmfare magazine as part of its annual Filmfare Awards South for Tamil (Kollywood) films.

The award was introduced and first given at the 50th South Filmfare Awards in 2003, with Kalabhavan Mani being the first recipient. This category has been retired from 2005.

Winners

Nominations

2000s
2003 Jeevan (actor) - Kaaka Kaaka as Pandiya
 FEFSI Vijayan - Joot 
 Kota Srinivasa Rao - Saamy

References

External links
 52nd Annual Awards

Villain